Radiotrophic fungi are hypothesized fungi that can perform the hypothetical biological process called  radiosynthesis, which means using ionizing radiation as an energy source to drive metabolism. It has been claimed that radiotrophic fungi have been found in extreme environments such as in the Chernobyl Nuclear Power Plant.

Most alleged radiotrophic fungi allegedly use melanin in some capacity to survive. The process of using radiation and melanin for energy has been termed radiosynthesis, and is thought to be analogous to anaerobic respiration. However, it is not known if multi-step processes such as photosynthesis or chemosynthesis are used in radiosynthesis or even if radiosynthesis exists in living organisms.

Discovery
Radiotrophic fungi were discovered in 1991 growing inside and around the Chernobyl Nuclear Power Plant. It was specifically noted that colonies of melanin rich fungi had begun to rapidly grow within the cooling waters of the reactors within the power plant, turning them black. While there are many cases of extremophiles (organisms that can live in severe conditions such as that of the radioactive power plant) microbiologist Arturo Casadevall believed that these fungi were growing because of the radiation rather than in spite of it. 

Further research conducted at the Albert Einstein College of Medicine showed that three melanin-containing fungi—Cladosporium sphaerospermum, Wangiella dermatitidis, and Cryptococcus neoformans—increased in biomass and accumulated acetate faster in an environment in which the radiation level was 500 times higher than in the normal environment. Exposure of C. neoformans cells to these radiation levels rapidly (within 20–40 minutes of exposure) altered the chemical properties of its melanin, and increased melanin-mediated rates of electron transfer (measured as reduction of ferricyanide by NADH) three- to four-fold compared with unexposed cells. Similar effects on melanin electron-transport capability were observed by the authors after exposure to non-ionizing radiation, suggesting that melanotic fungi might also be able to use light or heat radiation for growth.

Role of melanin 
Melanins are a family of naturally-occurring ancient pigments with radio-protective properties that are generally dark brown/black. It is important to note that melanin has a high molecular weight. This pigment can transduce and shield energy, therefore it can absorb electromagnetic radiation, including light. This quality means that melanin can protect melanized fungi from ionizing radiation. The energy transduction enhances growth in the fungi as well, meaning that melanized fungi grow faster. Melanin is also an advantage to the fungus in that it helps it survive in many different, more extreme, and varying environments. Examples of these environments include the damaged reactor at Chernobyl, the International Space Station, and the Antarctic mountains. Melanin may also be able to help the fungus metabolize radiation into energy, but more evidence and research is still needed.

Comparisons with non-melanized fungi 
Melanization may come at some metabolic cost to the fungal cells. In the absence of radiation, some non-melanized fungi (that had been mutated in the melanin pathway) grew faster than their melanized counterparts. Limited uptake of nutrients due to the melanin molecules in the fungal cell wall or toxic intermediates formed in melanin biosynthesis have been suggested to contribute to this phenomenon. It is consistent with the observation that despite being capable of producing melanin, many fungi do not synthesize melanin constitutively (i.e., all the time), but often only in response to external stimuli or at different stages of their development. The exact biochemical processes in the suggested melanin-based synthesis of organic compounds or other metabolites for fungal growth, including the chemical intermediates (such as native electron donor and acceptor molecules) in the fungal cell and the location and chemical products of this process, are unknown.

Use in human spaceflight 
It is hypothesized that radiotrophic fungi could potentially be used as a shield to protect against radiation, specifically in affiliation to the use of astronauts in space or other atmospheres. An experiment taking place at the International Space Station in December 2018 through January 2019 was conducted in order to test whether the use of radiotrophic fungi could aid in protection against ionizing radiation in space, as part of research efforts preceding a possible trip to Mars. This experiment used the radiotrophic strain of the fungi Cladosporium sphaerospermum. The growth of this fungi and its ability to deflect the effects of ionizing radiation were studied for 30 days aboard the International Space Station. This experimental trial yielded very promising results.

The amount of radiation deflected was found to have a direct correlation to the amount of fungus. There was no difference in the reduction of ionizing radiation between the experimental and control group within the first 24 hour period; however, once the radiotrophic fungi had reached an adequate maturation, and with a 180° protection radius, it was found that amounts of ionizing radiation were significantly reduced as compared to the control group. With a 1.7 mm thick shield of melanized radiotrophic Cladosporium sphaerospermum, measurements of radiation nearing the end of the experimental trial were found to be 2.42% lower, demonstrating radiation deflecting capabilities five times that of the control group. Under circumstances in which the fungi would fully encompass an entity, radiation levels would be reduced by an estimated 4.34±0.7%. Estimations indicate that approximately a 21 cm thick layer could significantly deflect the annual amount of radiation received on Mars’ surface. Limitations to the use of a radiotrophic fungi based shield include increased mass on missions. However as a viable substitute to reduce overall mass on potential Mars missions, a mixture with equal mole concentration of Martian soil, melanin, and a layer of fungi roughly 9 cm thick, could be used.

See also

 
 Nylon-eating bacteria

References

External links
Einstein College of Medicine on radiotrophic fungi
The blacker the better… especially in Chernobyl at Earthling Nature.

Fungi by adaptation
Evolution by taxon
Radiation effects
Radiobiology
Gamma rays
Extremophiles